Hole in the Wall is a Philippine television game show broadcast by GMA Network. Hosted by Michael V. and Ogie Alcasid, it premiered on April 20, 2009 on the network's Telebabad line up. The show concluded on November 27, 2010 with a total of 2 seasons and 235 episodes.

Hosts

 Ogie Alcasid as Angelina and Kim Min Yung
 Michael V. as Yaya and Bianca

Ratings
According to AGB Nielsen Philippines' Mega Manila household television ratings, the pilot episode of Hole in the Wall earned a 27.7% rating.

References

External links
 

2009 Philippine television series debuts
2010 Philippine television series endings
Filipino-language television shows
GMA Network original programming
Philippine game shows
Philippine television series based on non-Philippine television series